Kabwa (Ekikabwa) is a Bantu language of Tanzania.

Writing system

References

Languages of Tanzania
Great Lakes Bantu languages